The pale frog (Litoria pallida) is a species of frog in the subfamily Pelodryadinae, endemic to Australia.
Its natural habitats are subtropical or tropical dry forests, subtropical or tropical seasonally wet or flooded lowland grassland, and intermittent freshwater marshes.

References

Litoria
Amphibians of Western Australia
Amphibians of Queensland
Amphibians of the Northern Territory
Amphibians described in 1983
Taxonomy articles created by Polbot
Frogs of Australia